Nebria lafresnayei lafresnayei is a subspecies of beetle in the family Carabidae that can be found in Andorra, France, and  Spain.

References

lafresnayei lafresnayei
Beetles described in 1821
Beetles of Europe